Somewhere Down in Texas is the twenty-third studio album by American country music singer George Strait. This album was released on June 28, 2005 on the MCA Nashville Records label. This album was certified platinum and peaked at #1 on the Billboard 200. Singles released from it were, in order: "You'll Be There", which peaked at #4 on Hot Country Songs; "She Let Herself Go", which became Strait's 40th Billboard Number One hit on the country charts; and a cover of Merle Haggard's "The Seashores of Old Mexico", which peaked at #11. "Texas" also charted at #35 on Hot Country Songs from unsolicited airplay.

The album's titled track was played in a video retrospective to former wrestler Stone Cold Steve Austin that appeared as the last chapter of the same name in the DVD, "Stone Cold" Steve Austin: The Bottom Line on the Most Popular Superstar of All Time.

In 2005, the Country Music Association named "Good News, Bad News" the musical event of the year.

Track listing

Personnel
Eddie Bayers – drums (all tracks)
Stuart Duncan – fiddle (all tracks except 4), mandolin (tracks 3,4)
Paul Franklin – pedal steel guitar (all tracks)
Steve Gibson – acoustic guitar (tracks 1,8,10,11), electric guitar (all tracks except 1,10,11)
Wes Hightower – background vocals (all tracks except 3,4,6)
Brent Mason – acoustic guitar (track 6), electric guitar on (all tracks except 3,6,9), nylon string guitar (track 3)
Steve Nathan – piano (track 7) Hammond B-3 organ (tracks 1,2,5,8,9,10,11), Wurlitzer (track 3)
Michael Rhodes – bass guitar (track 3)
Matt Rollings – piano (all tracks except 7 and 9), synthesizer (track 7)
Marty Slayton – background vocals (all tracks except 3,4,6)
George Strait – lead vocals (all tracks), background vocals (track 3)
Bryan Sutton – acoustic guitar (all tracks except 6), gut string guitar (track 6)
Lee Ann Womack – duet vocals (track 6)
Casey Wood – percussion (track 4)
Glenn Worf – bass guitar (all tracks except 3 and 5), upright bass (track 5)

Additional background vocals on "You'll Be There" by Jaime Babbitt, Robert Bailey, Lisa Cochran, Vicki Hampton, Chris Rodriguez, Casey Wood.

Strings on tracks 2, 3, 4, and 6 performed by the Nashville String Machine. Arranged and conducted by Bergen White and contracted by Carl Gorodetzky.

Charts

Weekly charts

Year-end charts

References

External links
 

2005 albums
George Strait albums
MCA Records albums
Albums produced by Tony Brown (record producer)